Preston Parks was a faithless elector during 1948 United States presidential election.

A member of Tennessee Democratic Party, Parks was chosen by his Party as elector for Democratic nominees - Harry S. Truman and Alben W. Barkley. He, however, actively campaigned for the Dixiecrats, a splinter group of segregationist Southern Democrats, who ran their own (Strom Thurmond/Fielding L. Wright) ticket, opposing Truman's civil rights policy.

This made Parks the only elector pledged to one party, who had campaigned for another ticket. Truman carried Tennessee but Preston, although formally pledged to him, cast his vote, as vowed, on Thurmond and Wright. The other Democratic Tennessee elector took the same vow as Parks, but ultimately voted for the Democratic Party ticket.

Parks sole faithless vote, in addition to votes from States carried by Thurmond (South Carolina, Mississippi, Alabama and Louisiana), gave the Dixiecrat ticket a total count of 39 votes in the electoral college.

References
FairVote - Faithless Electors 

People from Tennessee
Tennessee Democrats
Faithless electors
Year of birth missing
Year of death unknown
Tennessee Dixiecrats
Old Right (United States)